The Juno Fan Choice Award is an annual Juno Award presented since 2003 by the Canadian Academy of Recording Arts and Sciences (CARAS) to the favourite artist or group of the year as voted by Canadian music fans. This is the only award that the winner is chosen by the fans. The nominees in the category are determined by sales, and the winner is chosen from among these nominees by an online vote open to the general public. From 2003 to 2011, the list of nominees was limited to five artists or groups, but it was expanded to ten in 2012.

Achievements
The record for the most wins in this category is held by Justin Bieber, with 5 awards. Avril Lavigne and Shawn Mendes have won 4 awards each, while Michael Bublé has won 3 awards each, followed by Nickelback with 2 awards. Justin Bieber has also received the most nominations overall, with 10.

Recipients

References

External links
 Official JUNO Fan Choice Award website
 Official JUNO Awards website

Fan Choice